Harald Walder (born 30 August 1973) is an Austrian former snowboarder. He competed in the men's parallel giant slalom event at the 2006 Winter Olympics.

References

External links
 

1973 births
Living people
Austrian male snowboarders
Olympic snowboarders of Austria
Snowboarders at the 2006 Winter Olympics
People from Lienz
Sportspeople from Tyrol (state)